True Blood is an American television drama series created by Alan Ball and based on The Southern Vampire Mysteries (also known as The Sookie Stackhouse novels) by Charlaine Harris. It aired on HBO from September 7, 2008 to August 24, 2014. A total of 80 episodes of True Blood were broadcast over seven seasons.

The series revolves around Sookie Stackhouse (Anna Paquin), a telepathic waitress who is living in the rural town of Bon Temps, Louisiana two years after the invention of a synthetic blood called Tru Blood  that has allowed vampires to "come out of the coffin" and allow their presence to be known to mankind. Now they are struggling for equal rights and assimilation, while anti-vampire organizations begin to gain power. Sookie's world is turned upside down when she falls in love with 173-year-old vampire Bill Compton (Stephen Moyer) and for the first time must navigate the trials, tribulations and terrors of intimacy and relationships. Other characters include Tara Thornton (Rutina Wesley), Sookie's tough-talking best friend, her womanizing brother Jason (Ryan Kwanten), thousand year old vampire and Sheriff of Area 5, Eric Northman (Alexander Skarsgård), and her shape-shifting boss Sam Merlotte (Sam Trammell). True Blood follows a serialized format, with most episodes ending on a cliffhanger that leads directly into the next. Episode titles are taken from the name of a song that appears on the soundtrack of that episode.

Series overview

Episodes

Season 1 (2008)

Season 2 (2009)

Season 3 (2010)

Season 4 (2011)

Season 5 (2012)

Season 6 (2013)

Season 7 (2014)

Minisodes 
HBO began airing six mini-episodes of Drop of True Blood on April 24, 2010 to lead up to the season three premiere.

Ratings
<noinclude>

Specials

Home video releases

References

External links 
 
 

True Blood
True Blood
True Blood
True Blood